{{DISPLAYTITLE:C8H14O4}}
The molecular formula C8H14O4 may refer to:

 Diethyl succinate
 Dimethyl_adipate
 Ethyl acetoxy butanoate
 Fructone
 Suberic acid
 2,2,3,3-Tetramethylsuccinic acid

Molecular formulas